This page lists all described species of the spider family Viridasiidae accepted by the World Spider Catalog :

Viridasius

Viridasius Simon, 1889
 V. fasciatus (Lenz, 1886) (type) — Madagascar

Vulsor

Vulsor Simon, 1889
 V. bidens Simon, 1889 (type) — Comoros, Mayotte
 V. isaloensis (Ono, 1993) — Madagascar
 V. occidentalis Mello-Leitão, 1922 — Brazil
 V. penicillatus Simon, 1896 — Madagascar
 V. septimus Strand, 1907 — Madagascar
 V. sextus Strand, 1907 — Madagascar

References

Viridasiidae